Beduini  is a Gram-negative bacterial genus from the family of Clostridiaceae, with one known species (Beduini massiliensis).

See also
 List of bacterial orders
 List of bacteria genera

References

Clostridiaceae
Monotypic bacteria genera
Bacteria genera
Taxa described in 2015